Aleurites moluccanus, the candlenut, is a flowering tree in the spurge family, Euphorbiaceae, also known as candleberry, Indian walnut, kemiri, varnish tree, nuez de la India, buah keras, godou, kukui nut tree, and rata kekuna.

Description
The leaves are pale green, simple, and ovate or heart-shaped on mature shoots, but may be three-, five-, or seven-lobed on saplings.

The kernel is the source of candlenut oil.

Taxonomy
This plant was first described by Carl Linnaeus in his work Species Plantarum (Sp. Pl. 2: 1006 (1753)) in 1753 as Jatropha moluccana. It was renamed as Aleurites moluccana in 1805 by Carl Ludwig Willdenow in a later edition of Species Plantarum (Sp. Pl. 4: 590 (1805)), but the ending was corrected to match the gender of the Latin genus Aleurites moluccanus.

Note 
While there are many online references to the name "Aleurites moluccana", this is not a name that is accepted by botanic authorities such as the International Plant Names Index (IPNI) or the Germplasm Resources Information Network (GRIN).

Etymology 
The genus name derives from the Ancient Greek ἄλευρον (áleuron), meaning "flour" or "meal", and refers to the new growth which appears to be dusted with flour. The species epithet means "from the Moluccas".

Distribution and habitat

Distribution 
Its native range is impossible to establish precisely because of early spread by humans, and the tree is now distributed throughout the New and Old World tropics.

The candlenut was first domesticated on the islands of Southeast Asia. Remains of harvested candlenuts have been recovered from archaeological sites in Timor and Morotai in eastern Indonesia, dated to around 13,000 and 11,000 BP, respectively. Archaeological evidence of candlenut cultivation is also found in Neolithic sites of the Toalean culture in southern Sulawesi dated to around 3,700 to 2,300 BP. Candlenuts were widely introduced into the Pacific islands by early Austronesian voyagers and became naturalized to high volcanic islands.

Habitat 
A. moluccanus grows in tropical rainforests and gallery forests. It is a very fast-growing tree and often appears in disturbed rainforest.

Ecology
In Australia the seeds are eaten by rodents, in particular the giant white-tailed rat. The broken shells of the fruits are often found underneath the trees.

The larvae of the coleopteran Agrianome fairmairei feed on dead candlenut wood, and are considered a delicacy in New Caledonia.

Names
The Proto-Austronesian word for candlenut is reconstructed as *kamiri, with modern cognates including Hanunó'o, Iban, and Sundanese muncang; Javanese and Malay kemiri; and Tetun kamii, but the Oceanian words for candlenut is believed to be derived, instead, from Proto-Austronesian *CuSuR which became Proto-Malayo-Polynesian *tuhuR, originally meaning "string together, as beads", referring to the construction of the candlenut torches. It became Proto-Eastern-Malayo-Polynesian and Proto-Oceanic *tuRi which is then reduplicated. Modern cognates including Fijian, Tongan, Rarotongan, and Niue tui-tui; and Hawaiian kui-kui or kukui.

The Malay language in both has another name given to the nut which is buah keras (literally "hard fruit").

Uses

Both the nut and the oil that can be extracted from it are used. While mildly toxic when raw, the nut is appreciated in many cultures once cooked or toasted. In Indonesian and Malaysian cuisine, it is commonly used in curries, and on the Indonesian island of Java, it is used to make a thick sauce that is eaten with vegetables and rice.

In the Philippines, the fruit and tree are traditionally known as lumbang, after which Lumban, a lakeshore town in Laguna province, is named.  Before the intrusion of non-native species, it was frequently used as a property-line manager, because its silvery underleaf makes the tree easy to distinguish from a distance.

In the state of Sabah, Malaysian Borneo, the Dusun tribes call the fruit godou and use it in tattoo-making as an optional ingredient for the ink.

A Hawaiian condiment known as ʻinamona is made from roasted kukui (candlenuts) mixed into a paste with salt. ʻInamona is a key ingredient in traditional Hawaiian poke.

In ancient Hawaiʻi, kukui nuts were burned to provide light. The nuts were strung in a row on a palm leaf midrib, lit on one end, and burned one by one every fifteen minutes or so. This led to their use as a measure of time. Hawaiians extracted the oil from the nut and burned it in a stone oil lamp called a kukui hele po (light, darkness goes) with a wick made of kapa cloth.

Hawaiians had many other uses for the tree, including leis from the shells, leaves, and flowers; ink for tattoos from charred nuts; a varnish with the oil; and fishermen would chew the nuts and spit them on the water to break the surface tension and remove reflections, giving them greater underwater visibility. A red-brown dye made from the inner bark was used on kapa and aho (Touchardia latifolia cordage). A coating of kukui oil helped preserve ʻupena (fishing nets). The nohona waʻa (seats), pale (gunwales) of waʻa (outrigger canoes) were made from the wood.  The trunk was sometimes used to make smaller canoes used for fishing.  Kukui was named the state tree of Hawaii on 1 May 1959 due to its multitude of uses. It also represents the island of Molokaʻi, whose symbolic color is the silvery green of the kukui leaf.

As recently as 1993 on the outlying islands of the kingdom of Tonga, candlenuts were chewed into sweet-scented emollient used during a traditional funerary ritual. They were used for making various sweet-smelling oils for the skin.

In Australia, Aboriginal Australians used them for a variety of similar purposes.

In Uganda, the seed is referred to as kabakanjagala, meaning "the king loves me".

In Fiji, this nut is called sikeci and its oil is used in cosmetic products.

Toxicity 
Because the seeds contain saponin and phorbol, they are mildly toxic when raw.   However, the kukui seed oil has no known toxicity and is not an irritant, even to the eyes.

Mythology 
In Maui, the kukui is a symbol of enlightenment, protection, and peace. Kamapuaʻa, the hog-man fertility demigod, was said to be able to transform into a kukui tree. One of the legends told of Kamapuaʻa: one day, a man beat his wife to death and buried her beneath Kamapuaʻa while he was in tree form.

Gallery

See also 
 Domesticated plants and animals of Austronesia
 Candlenut oil

References

External links 

 
 
 
 
 Aleurites moluccana (L.) Willd Medicinal Plant Images Database (School of Chinese Medicine, Hong Kong Baptist University)  
 
 Aleurites moluccana usage of name
 Linnaeus 1805 Species Plantarum Volume 4, full text free download from BHL

Aleuritideae
Symbols of Hawaii
Edible nuts and seeds
Medicinal plants
Flora of China
Flora of Taiwan
Flora of tropical Asia

Flora of Queensland